Jack Jacobs (16 April 1909 – 15 June 2003) was a New Zealand cricketer. He played first-class cricket for Canterbury between 1927 and 1938.

Jacobs attended Christchurch Boys' High School. He was a batsman who occasionally kept wicket. His highest first-class scores were 61 (Canterbury's top score) and 69 in his first match in December 1927, when Canterbury beat Otago by four wickets. He played senior cricket in Christchurch until the early 1950s, and was a member of the Canterbury Cricket Association's management committee in the 1930s and 1940s.

Jacobs served in Greece and Crete with the New Zealand Army in World War II. He was captured by the Germans and spent several years as a prisoner of war. After the war ended in Europe he toured England with the New Zealand Services team from May to September 1945, playing in the team's only first-class match.

References

External links

1909 births
2003 deaths
People educated at Christchurch Boys' High School
New Zealand cricketers
Canterbury cricketers
Cricketers from Dunedin
New Zealand Jews
New Zealand military personnel of World War II
New Zealand prisoners of war in World War II
New Zealand Services cricketers